Tishomingo (from )) was a renowned war chief of the Chickasaw nation in Mississippi.

Early life and military service
Tishomingo was born c. 1735 in British America (present-day Mississippi). He served with U.S. Army Major-General Anthony Wayne against the Shawnee in Northwest Territory and received a silver medal from President George Washington. He led by example and was respected for his honesty and high moral standards, serving with distinction at Fallen Timbers, in the Red Stick War with the Creeks, and the War of 1812. During the War of 1812, he served under future president Andrew Jackson.

Later life and the "Trail of Tears"
After the War of 1812, Tishomingo retired to his farm until white settlers came onto his land. He traveled to Philadelphia and Washington, D.C., and was a principal signatory of the treaties of 1816 and 1818 as well as the 1832 Treaty of Pontotoc. In 1837, a final treaty forced him and his family to relocate to Indian Territory.

Chief Tishomingo was reported to have had a kidney stone operation March 25, 1821, in Columbus, Mississippi performed by Dr. Henderson and Dr. Barry. The article stated, "...the patient is supposed to be in his 63d year..." This would place his birth approximately in the year 1758.

Death
According to Tishomingo's son Richard, Tishomingo died c. 1837 on Brushy Creek in the Choctaw Nation on the same day as his wife "U-Kuth-Le-Ya" died. This was during the time both Chickasaw and Choctaw tribes resided together in Indian Territory. Both he and his wife's burials were witnessed by two Chickasaw Warriors who had served with Tishomingo in the War of 1812. They gave their testimony attesting to the facts of the couple's deaths to the Indian Agent, Douglas H. Cooper, on September 27, 1859, in accordance with the requirements of a Bounty Land Application of Richard.

Legacy
The county of Tishomingo, town of Tishomingo, and Tishomingo park in Mississippi; and the capital of Tishomingo in the Chickasaw Nation are named for him.

See also
Piomingo; another Chickasaw chief

Note

References

External links 
 Chief Tishomingo Home Site at Historical Marker Database

1735 births
1837 deaths
18th-century Native Americans
American people of the Northwest Indian War
American people of the War of 1812
Chickasaw people
Infectious disease deaths in Arkansas
Native American leaders
Native Americans in the War of 1812
People of the Creek War
People from Mississippi
Trail of Tears